Robert A. Campbell may refer to:
Robert Alexander Campbell, lieutenant governor of Missouri 1881–1885
Robert Adam Campbell, member of the Legislative Assembly of Ontario, 1894–1899
Robert A. Campbell (mayor) (1865–1947), mayor of Ann Arbor, Michigan 1925–1927

See also
Robert Campbell (disambiguation)